Beautiful People is a British comedy drama television series based on the memoirs of Barneys creative director Simon Doonan. The series takes place in Reading, Berkshire, in 1997, where thirteen-year-old Simon Doonan and his best friend Kylie dream of escaping their dreary suburban surroundings and moving to cosmopolitan London "to live amongst the beautiful people". The first episode aired on BBC Two on 2 October 2008 and recorded overnight ratings of 1.5 million viewers and positive critical reaction. Episodes are self-contained, but do follow a loose story arc throughout the course of each series. The second and final series finished airing on 18 December 2009.

Series synopses

Series 1
In 2008 New York City, Simon Doonan, a window-dresser at Barneys, tells his boyfriend Sacha various tales from his childhood in Reading. Most of Simon's stories center around how he came to own some of his most treasured possessions, which he finds a place for in his eccentric window displays. Over the course of the series, young Simon struggles to express his love of music, theatre, and fashion in a working class community, with local hooligans hounding him at school and a supportive but quirky family squashing his efforts at home. While it is implied, sexuality is not relevant.

Series 2
The second series of Beautiful People was broadcast in 2009, when Simon returns to Reading to mend his heart after breaking up with his boyfriend Sacha. As in the first series, Simon recounts stories from his childhood in Reading, but speaks directly to the viewer instead of to Sacha. Simon and Kylie's sexuality becomes more overt in the second series as the two lads become more comfortable with themselves. In the series finale, Simon finds himself attracted to a new boy at school, prompting him to come out to his mother after being dissuaded from running away from home.

Cast and characters

Main 

Simon Doonan (Luke Ward-Wilkinson), an effeminate 14-year-old schoolboy who longs to escape 1990s Reading for the glamour of London. Played by Samuel Barnett in present-day scenes.
Kylie Parkinson (Layton Williams), Simon's best friend, whose real name is Kyle. Similarly gay, he is obsessed with Kylie Minogue and idolises Princess Diana. Played by Howard Charles in a present-day scene, but is voiced by Williams.
Debbie Doonan (Olivia Colman), Simon's mother, a brash barmaid who speaks her mind and has a slight drinking problem.
Andy Doonan (Aidan McArdle), Simon's father, a hardworking Irish plumber.
Ashlene Doonan (Sophie Ash), Simon's sister, known to be promiscuous.
Aunty Hayley (Meera Syal), Simon's blind "aunt" and Debbie's best friend, who lodges with the Doonans.
Reba Parkinson (Sarah Niles), Kylie's mother, the Doonans' neighbour, and Debbie's rival.

Recurring

Narg (Brenda Fricker), Simon's nan; first an angelic Catholic woman, soon turns nasty and difficult after electroshock therapy.
Mummy, Aunty Hayley's overweight guide dog.
Tameka (Tameka Empson), Debbie's rum-loving hairdresser.
Johoyo (Tameka Empson), Tameka's eccentric identical Nigerian cousin who takes over her salon after her death.
Sacha (Gary Amers), present-day Simon's New York partner in series 1.
Jayeson Jackson (Josh Handley), Simon's classmate, who often bullies and torments Simon for being effeminate/fay.
Miss Perrin (Michelle Butterly), the headmistress at Simon's school, whom he counts as one of the few "beautiful people" in Reading.

Production 
The comedy was greenlit in May 2008 by Controller of BBC Two Lucy Lumsden and Controller of Comedy Commissioning Roly Keating. The six episodes were written by Jonathan Harvey (Gimme Gimme Gimme) and directed by Gareth Carrivick. Studio filming was done at Shepperton Studios and exterior locations at South Oxhey and Bushey, Hertfordshire, Harrow, London, Grahame Park concourse and New York City. Exterior scenes of the cul de sac where Simon lives are filmed on Crabtree Close in Bushey. Doonan grew up in Reading in the 1960s but Harvey moved the setting forward to the 1990s. Executive producer Jon Plowman hoped audiences would relate to Simon's childhood; "Every teenager thinks they're different [...] I hope the audience will think: 'That's me as a teenager being laughed at. Everyone else was in a gang together, and I was in a gang of one.' But the truth is, everyone is in a gang of one."

Olivia Colman helped the cast to bond on set by arranging a visit from a mobile blood donor unit.

Episodes

Series 1 (2008)

Series 2 (2009)

Broadcast 
Series 1 of Beautiful People  premiered on 2 October 2008. It was broadcast on Thursdays at 21:30 on BBC Two, during the channel's "Thursdays Are Funny" strand, and at 22:00 on BBC HD.

The second series debuted on 13 November 2009 at 22:00 on BBC Two. The flashbacks in the second series are set in 1998. In the present-day scenes, Sacha and Simon have split up and Simon has returned to Reading. An ongoing storyline in 1998 concerns the unplanned pregnancy of Simon's sister Ashlene.

Reception

Critical reaction 
The series was previewed by The Guardians Grace Dent as "a sort of camp, working-class British Arrested Development". Dent wrote that it "made [her] laugh more than anything [she had] seen so far on TV this year". Tim Teeman, the entertainment editor for The Times, rated "How I Got My Vase" three out of five stars. Teeman complimented Ward-Wilkinson's and Williams's acting but did not believe the 1990s were long ago enough to feel nostalgia for. Hermione Eyre for The Independent praised Williams and Colman, and compared the show to The Secret Diary of Adrian Mole.

Ratings 
Series 1 of Beautiful People  was broadcast on Thursdays at 21:30 on BBC Two. Series 2 was broadcast at 22:00 on Fridays on BBC Two.

Awards 
In 2010, Beautiful People was nominated for a GLAAD Media Award for "Outstanding Comedy Series" during the 21st GLAAD Media Awards.

Merchandise 
Doonan's memoirs have been re-released with a tie-in cover by HarperCollins.
An accompanying soundtrack to the series was released by EMI on 20 October 2008. Whilst mostly being a compilation of the hit records from the 70s, 80s and 90s that were used in the series, the album also contains new cover versions, including a duet by Kylie and Dannii Minogue of ABBA's "The Winner Takes It All", and a version of Dolly Parton's 1970s hit "Jolene" covered by Sophie Ellis-Bextor.

References

External links 

 

British Comedy Guide
Beautiful People playlist at BBC YouTube channel
Logo web site in the US
The Real Life Simon Doonan's website
Interview with Simon Doonan about the TV series Beautiful People

2008 British television series debuts
2009 British television series endings
2000s British comedy television series
BBC television comedy
English-language television shows
Culture in Reading, Berkshire
2000s British LGBT-related comedy television series
Television series about teenagers